The 2000 FIA GT Zolder 500 km was the sixth round the 2000 FIA GT Championship season.  It took place at the Circuit Zolder, Belgium, on July 23, 2000.

Official results
Class winners in bold.  Cars failing to complete 70% of winner's distance marked as Not Classified (NC).

Statistics
 Pole position - #14 Lister Storm Racing - 1:34.527
 Fastest lap - #25 Carsport Holland - 1:36.032
 Average speed - 149.510 km/h

References

 
 
 

Z
FIA GT
Auto races in Belgium